Nebria cordicollis gracilis is a subspecies of ground beetle in the Nebriinae subfamily that is endemic to Switzerland.

References

cordicollis gracilis
Beetles described in 1890
Beetles of Europe
Endemic fauna of Switzerland